Charity Chetachukwu Reuben (born December 25, 2000) is a Nigerian footballer, who plays for Bayelsa Queens. She previously represented Ibom Angels in the Nigeria Women Premier League, and Nigeria women's national under-20 football team. For the 2017 Nigeria Women Premier League, she scored eight goals, which was the most by any player in the league.

Career 
After joining from Rivers Angels in 2015, Reuben scored six goals during the 2016 Nigeria Women Premier League. Charity featured for Nigeria at the 2016 FIFA U-20 Women's World Cup. In February 2018, she was nominated by the Nigeria Football Federation for 2017 Women Player of the Year. In May 2018, she was nominated as the best player in the 2017 Nigeria Women Premier League at Nigeria Pitch Awards, but lost the award to Rasheedat Ajibade. Charity Reuben plays for Bayelsa Queens football club since 2019.

References

External links
 
 

Nigerian women's footballers
Living people
2000 births
Expatriate women's footballers in Kazakhstan
Nigerian expatriate sportspeople in Kazakhstan
Rivers Angels F.C. players
BIIK Kazygurt players
Women's association football forwards
Bayelsa Queens F.C. players
Ibom Angels F.C. players